Michael Carlin (born October 6, 1958) is an American comic book writer, editor, and executive. He has worked principally for Marvel Comics and DC Comics since the 1970s.

Early life
Carlin attended the High School of Art and Design in Manhattan, graduating in 1976. He received a Bachelor of Fine Arts in Cartooning from the School of Visual Arts in New York in 1980.

Career
Mike Carlin started out in the business at DC Comics as a high school intern in 1974. He was hired by Marvel Comics as a writer and artist on Crazy Magazine, the company's black-and-white humor title at the end of 1980. His first work appeared in print in 1981. He later became an assistant editor under Mark Gruenwald in 1982 and wrote a short run of stories in Captain America and Ka-Zar as well as the Assistant Editors' Month issue of Marvel Team-Up (Aunt May and Franklin Richards vs. Galactus). Carlin moved to DC Comics as of October 6, 1986, his 28th birthday, and became group editor of the Superman titles. He oversaw "The Death of Superman" storyline and the subsequent introduction of such characters as the Kon-El version of Superboy and John Henry Irons. From 1996 to 2002, he served as an executive editor at DC Comics. As of 2011, he was DC Entertainment's Creative Director of Animation.

Appearances within comics
The backup story "Bernie America, Sentinel of Liberty" in Captain America #289 (Jan. 1984) features Mike Carlin dressed as The Watcher, introducing the story.

The Batman Adventures #13, the first DC Comics spinoff of Batman: The Animated Series — features a screwball trio of incompetent super-villains: the Mastermind (a caricature of Mike Carlin), The Perfessor (a caricature of Dennis O'Neil), and Mr. Nice (a caricature of Archie Goodwin), a super-strong but childishly-innocent super-villain.

Superman: The Man of Steel #75 (Jan. 1998) is a pastiche of Superman's death in Superman vol. 2 #75 (Jan. 1993), where Mister Mxyzptlk creates a duplicate of Doomsday. The confrontation culminates with Mxyzptlk meeting the Supreme Being who turns out to be Mike Carlin, the then-editor of the Superman titles, who promptly brings him back to life.

Awards
 1994 Eisner Award for Best Editor, for the Superman titles
 1994 Inkpot Award

Nominations
 1992 Eisner Award for Best Editor, for the Superman titles and The Psycho

Bibliography

DC Comics

 Batman: Gotham Knights #21 (Batman Black and White) (2001)
 Cartoon Network Presents #8 (1998)
 Flashpoint: The Canterbury Cricket #1 (2011)
 Flintstones and the Jetsons #1–2 (1997)
 Green Lantern Annual #3 (1987)
 Green Lantern Corps Quarterly #8 (1994)
 Metal Men vol. 2 #1–4 (1993–1994)
 Secret Origins vol. 2 #33 (Mister Miracle) (1988)
 Showcase '95 #2, 6 (1995)
 Star Trek #41–47 (1987–1988)
 Star Trek: The Next Generation #1–6 (1988)

Marvel Comics

 Amazing High Adventure #1 (1984)
 Bizarre Adventures #34 (1983)
 Captain America #301–306 (1985)
 Crazy Magazine #72, 74, 80, 83–92 (1981–1982)
 Daredevil #202 (1984)
 Dazzler #32–34 (1984)
 Ka-Zar the Savage #28–34 (1983–1984)
 Marvel Fanfare #39 (Moon Knight) (1988)
 Marvel Team-Up #137 (1984)
 Masters of the Universe #1–8 (1986–1987)
 Peter Porker, the Spectacular Spider-Ham #4, 11, 13–14, 17 (1985–1987)
 The Thing #14–17, 23–36 (1984–1986)

References

External links
 
 
 Mike Carlin at Mike's Amazing World of Comics
 Mike Carlin at the Unofficial Handbook of Marvel Comics Creators

1958 births
American comics artists
American comics writers
Comic book editors
DC Comics people
Eisner Award winners
High School of Art and Design alumni
Inkpot Award winners
Living people
Marvel Comics writers